York House, also known as Parliament House, was a landmark in St. George's and the home of the Parliament of Grenada from the 19th century until it was destroyed by Hurricane Ivan in 2004. It was replaced by the New Parliament Building in 2010.

History 
The building was built in the 1770s and was named after the Duke of York who visited Grenada in the eighteen century.

Queen Elizabeth II visited the Parliament in 1985.

References 

Government buildings in Grenada
Buildings and structures in St. George's, Grenada
Former seats of national legislatures
Hurricane Ivan
Demolished buildings and structures in Grenada
1780s architecture
Buildings and structures completed in 1775